Joseph Tandy (1 January 1983 – 13 May 2009) was a British racing driver and team owner.

Career

Ministox
Tandy started his racing career unusually in short oval Ministox machinery in 1994. However, by the end of 1998, Tandy had won 45 races, with 60 other podium placings as he became both British and World Ministox champion, as well as being a three-time East Anglian Ministox champion. He continued in this level of motorsport in 1999, winning another 28 races to become British champion for the second time.

Mini Sevens
After a year off in 2000, Tandy took up circuit racing by moving into the Mini Seven Challenge in 2001. He competed in four seasons in the championship, picking up ten podiums, including three wins, all coming in 2004. He also won the Walter Hayes Memorial Trophy towards the end of the season. He also forayed into the TVR Tuscan Challenge by the end of 2004.

Formula Palmer Audi
After finishing college and completing an engineering apprenticeship, Tandy began working as a technician for Jonathan Palmer's Palmersport corporate driving days concern. His engineering acumen elevated him to chief mechanic by the age of 22, while his racing career continued to go from strength to strength. This allowed him to test a Formula Palmer Audi car at Palmer's Bedford Autodrome, where he set a new lap record of 1:04.2 for the 1.8-mile West Circuit, breaking Justin Wilson's long established record from 1998. This gave him an incentive to sell his 70 bhp Mini and move up into the 350 bhp single-seaters.

Tandy had an impressive season in the championship, eventually winning the title on countback ahead of David Epton. Tandy and Epton had both finished on 284 points, but Tandy won the title thanks to six wins compared to Epton's four. This championship-winning campaign earned him one of the six nominations for the McLaren Autosport BRDC Award.

Joe Tandy Racing
Tandy's racing career somewhat stalled after that, before creating Joe Tandy Racing in mid-2006. Brother Nick had been struggling with his Ray car lacking upgrades, but Joe decided to buy a similar chassis and run Nick for the rest of the campaign. The success was immediate, as Nick won first time out at Thruxton, and added another win at the championship finale at Castle Combe, as he finished runner-up in the championship standings. An on-the-road win at the 2006 Formula Ford Festival would have capped an amazing year for JTR, however Nick was penalised for a safety car misdemeanour, dropping him to fifth.

The Tandys then expanded the team to three cars in 2007, with Nick, Freddie Hunt (son of  Formula One world champion James Hunt) and Daniel Murray driving the Ray machines. Nick won six races en route to third in the championship, twelve points behind runner-up James Nash. After their Formula Ford Festival win was taken away the year before, Nick won the race in 2007, after Callum MacLeod was given a two-second time penalty for braking severely while leading under the safety car.

To aid with his brother's rise through the motorsport ranks, Joe bought a Mygale Formula Three chassis for a campaign in the British Formula Three Championship. He also moved his Formula Ford team onto the French company's chassis. Tandy managed to turn the Mygale into a regular frontrunner, railing against the established Dallara hordes with a small operation and a meagre budget. Despite missing the rounds in Bucharest, Nick managed to finish ninth overall in the championship, with three podiums coming at Spa, Silverstone and Donington. In Formula Ford, despite not achieving any wins, Matt Hamilton finished as JTR's best driver with sixth overall.

2009 saw new chassis again for both the Formula Three team and the Formula Ford team, as JTR became the de facto lead team for Mygale in both series, as Ultimate Motorsport pulled out of Formula Three before the start of the 2009 season. Nick started in fine form with a double podium at the season-opening rounds at Oulton Park, and just eighteen days after his brother's death, took the team's first win at Rockingham. Meanwhile, in Formula Fords, Josef Newgarden and Liroy Stuart were signed to campaign the cars, with Newgarden winning the third round of the championship, again at Oulton Park. The team will continue running, in spite of Tandy's death.

Death
Tandy was travelling with his fiancée Sophie Temple's brother, Luke Temple, in his BMW 5 Series towards Bedford, when a collision between the BMW and a box van occurred at around 12:25 local time, at the junction of the A428 and the A5134 roads just outside Bromham. Tandy died at the scene, while Temple was airlifted to Addenbrooke's Hospital in Cambridge, where he later died due to serious head injuries sustained in the crash. The van driver suffered minor injuries in the accident. The van driver was cleared of all charges at court and it was found that Tandy had been driving a car with a faulty braking system at nearly twice the speed limit for that stretch of road, while nearly two times over the drink drive limit.

Tandy's former boss Jonathan Palmer described him as "an extraordinary person who had achieved an enormous amount in his tragically short life. I have no doubt he was destined to go on to do increasingly great things in motorsport and could quite likely have been running one of the leading Formula One teams in the years ahead." SRO, which runs the British Formula Three Championship and also the British GT Championship also released a statement describing Tandy as "an extremely popular guy and the paddock will be a poorer place without him and his great sense of humour. He was a credit to his family, his team and to motorsport in general and they have all lost a very fine young man."

Sam Roach, director of the British Formula Ford Championship, added: "Joe was a talented, winning racer himself before he started JTR, and his enthusiasm and passion for the sport shone through everything he did. Everyone involved in Formula Ford in the UK feels his loss, none more so than me and my colleagues at RacingLine and Ford. Joe's family and friends have our deepest sympathies."

References

External links
Official website
Career statistics from Driver Database
Joe Tandy Racing website
Joe Tandy Racing Academy website

1983 births
2009 deaths
Road incident deaths in England
English racing drivers
Formula Ford drivers
Formula Palmer Audi drivers
Sportspeople from Bedford